STL may refer to:

Communications
Standard telegraph level
Studio/transmitter link

International law
Special Tribunal for Lebanon, an international criminal tribunal

Music
Stella Mwangi, a Norwegian-Kenyan singer also known as STL

Saint Louis, Missouri topics
St. Louis, Missouri
 St. Louis Cardinals, the city's Major League Baseball team
St. Louis Lambert International Airport (IATA airport code: STL)

Software
Standard Template Library (for C++)
.stl, a file format for subtitles
STL (file format), a file format for 3D CAD models
Statement List, programming language for Siemens SIMATIC S7

Transportation
Société de transport de Laval, public transit in Laval, QC Canada
Société de transport de Lévis, public transit in Lévis QC Canada
Southall railway station (National Rail station code: STL)

Other uses
 Sacrae Theologiae Licentiatus (Licentiate of Sacred Theology), a degree in Catholic religious studies
 Samarbeidsrådet for Tros- og Livssynssamfunn (Council for Religious and Life Stance Communities), Norway
 Send the Light, a British Christian book distributor
 Space Technology Laboratories, a former division of TRW Inc.
 Spurious trip level of a safety or alarm system
 Former UK Standard Telecommunication Laboratories
 Suara Timor Lorosae, a newspaper in East Timor